Muttonbird Island Nature Reserve is a nature reserve off the shore of Coffs Harbour, New South Wales, Australia, on the southern boundary of the Solitary Islands Marine Park. It is linked to the mainland by a causeway, which acts as the northern breakwater for the harbour. With over 5,500 breeding pairs, it is a major breeding ground for wedge-tailed shearwaters (Puffinus pacificus), known locally as muttonbirds, which migrate annually to the Philippines but return to breed on the island.

References

External links
 Muttonbird Island Nature Reserve at the NSW National Parks and Wildlife Service site

Islands of New South Wales
Coffs Harbour
Mid North Coast